Phaea elegantula is a species of beetle in the family Cerambycidae. It was described by Melzer in 1933. It is known from Costa Rica.

References

elegantula
Beetles described in 1933